The M3, officially referred to as the M3 Kirazli–Basaksehir Metro Line, is a , 9-station rapid transit line of the Istanbul Metro system on the European part of Istanbul, Turkey. It operates between Kirazlı-Bağcılar, extending the service of the M1B line from Yenikapı, to Başakşehir-Metrokent. The M3-line is colored light blue on station signs, route signs and the official rapid transit network map.

Construction
The construction of the line began in 2006 following the signing of the related contract in May of that year. By March 2009, the tunnels were completed. The rolling stock was delivered in January 2010, and in December of the same year, the first test run of the trains was accomplished. The line's operation rights were transferred from the İETT bus authority to Istanbul Ulaşım company in June 2011. After the line signalization system was completely installed in March 2012, test runs began in June 2012. On 11 September 2012 the M3-line started operating unofficially. The M3-line went into service officially on 14 June 2013. The Ikitelli-Olimpiyat branch was converted into the M9 in May 29, 2021.

Ziya Gökalp Mahallesi Station is the only underground station bored in situ without removing the ground above, while all other underground stations on the line are built by cut-and-cover method, constructed in a shallow trench and then covered over. The line's tunnels are twin tubes. The line between Kirazlı and MetroKent was constructed by tunnel boring machine (TBM) while the line between İkitelli and Olympic Stadium was built using the New Austrian Tunnelling method (NATM).

Technical features
The operation control center of the M3-line is situated in MetroKent Terminal. The rolling stock depot is capable of holding 180 cars.

The rolling stock was delivered by the French company Alstom. The fully air-contioned cars, costing each 1.149 million, feature seats covered with antibacterial textile material. It is possible to pass from one car to another in a train to enable a homogeneous  distribution of the passenger crowd.

A total of 80 cars, 20 sets of four-car trains, are able to transport up to 70,000 passenger per hour per direction between the operating hours from 6:00 h in the early morning to 0:00 h in the midnight. The ride between the terminals Kirazlı and MetroKent takes 20 minutes. The trains run every five minutes during rush hours.

Safety
All the stations are equipped with closed-circuit video system for continuous monitoring of the platforms. High-level fire safety systems, which include automatic fire extinguishers and fire exits, are installed in the metro line, where non-flammable and fireproofing materials were used.

Power supply of the line is provided at two different points. In case of power cut at both supply points, an emergency power system that becomes operational within 15 seconds, ensures running of the trains until the next station. If the backup generator system fails, an uninterruptible power source (UPS) supplies energy for emergency lighting and the electronic devices at the operations control center up to three hours. The signalization of the metro line as well as at the depots and railroad switches, also the vehicle drive-control systems are fully automated. However, they can be handled manually when needed.

Stations

Rolling stock
This line is operated by Alstom trains which are visually similar to the AM5-M2 and AM4-M4 trains also built by Alstom that operate on the Budapest Metro. The main difference is that the Istanbul units are equipped with pantographs for overhead line operation only while the Budapest units are equipped with shoegear for third rail operation only.

See also 
 Istanbul modern tramways
 Istanbul nostalgic tramways
 Marmaray
 Public transport in Istanbul

References

External links 

 

Istanbul Metro
Bağcılar
Başakşehir
Railway lines opened in 2013
2013 establishments in Turkey